Stabo Air is a privately owned cargo airline based in Lusaka, Zambia, operating from Lusaka International Airport. The company offers scheduled flights to Western Europe, East Africa and Southern Africa.

Destinations
As of January 2020 Stabo Air operates scheduled flights to the following destinations.

In addition to scheduled flights, the airline offers charter cargo flights to many parts of the world, mostly to destinations in sub-Saharan Africa.

Fleet
Stabo Air fleet consists of the following aircraft (as of January 2020):

References

External links
 Official website

Airlines of Zambia
Airlines established in 1994
1994 establishments in Zambia